Hausel is a surname. Notable people with the surname include:

Dan Hausel (born 1949), American karateka, geologist and writer
Tamás Hausel (born 1972), Hungarian mathematician

See also
Hauser